Statistics of International Soccer League III in season 1962.

League standings

Section I

Section II

Championship finals

First leg

Second leg 

América won 3–1 on aggregate.

American Challenge Cup
 FK Dukla Prague defeated America-RJ, 1–1 and 2–1, on goal aggregate.

References

International Soccer League seasons
International Soccer League, 1962